Leonard Tazvivinga Dembo, also Musoro We Nyoka (born Kwangwari Gwaindepi; 29 December 1959 in Chivi – 9 April 1996), was a Zimbabwean guitar-band musician and member of the bands Barura Express and The Outsiders. Incorporating traditional Shona sayings in his lyrics, his musical style was sungura-based, played on electric guitars tuned to emulate the characteristic sounds of the mbira.

References

Discography 
Albums

See also 
 Music of Zimbabwe
 Shona language

External links 
 Mbira, the non-profit organisation devoted to Shona Mbira Music
 https://www.discogs.com/artist/1985763-Leonard-Dembo

1961 births
1996 deaths
Zimbabwean guitarists
20th-century Zimbabwean male singers
20th-century guitarists